Oleksandr Sorokalet may refer to:

 Oleksandr Sorokalet (footballer) (1957–2009), Soviet Ukrainian football player
 Oleksandr Sorokalet (volleyball) (born 1959), Soviet Ukrainian volleyball player